Leonard Lane Hilton (September 28, 1947 – July 3, 2000) was an American long-distance runner.

Hilton was born in Hillsboro, Texas, and graduated from Austin High School in Houston. He attended the University of Houston; competing for the Cougars in 1970, he anchored a team that set a world record in the indoor distance medley relay in 1970. Hilton earned a degree in engineering from Houston. Hilton competed in the men's 5000 metres at the 1972 Summer Olympics. He was the first runner from Texas to break the four-minute mile. While working as a business executive in the energy field, Hilton died of pancreatic cancer in 2000.

References

External links
 

1947 births
2000 deaths
Athletes (track and field) at the 1972 Summer Olympics
American male long-distance runners
Olympic track and field athletes of the United States
People from Hillsboro, Texas
Track and field athletes from Texas
20th-century American people